The Lamborghini Urraco is a 2+2 sports car manufactured by Italian automaker Lamborghini, introduced at the Turin Auto Show in 1970, marketed for model years 1972-1979, and named after a line of Miura-bred fighting bulls; the name translates to "little bull".

History
The car is a 2+2 coupé with body designed by Marcello Gandini, at the time working for Carrozzeria Bertone. Rather than being another range topping sports car, like the Lamborghini Miura, the Urraco was intended to be more affordable and an alternative to the contemporary Ferrari Dino and Maserati Merak.

When production ceased in 1979, 791 Urracos had been built, of which 21 were Urraco P111s (P250 Tipo 111s) for the American market. In order to comply with American regulations, these cars had larger front bumpers and emissions controls, the latter resulting in less horsepower. The other Urraco versions were the Urraco P200, Urraco P250 and Urraco P300 with 2-litre, 2.5-litre, and 3-litre V8s respectively.

Both the Lamborghini Silhouette, with its detachable roof panel, and its successor Lamborghini Jalpa, with a 3.5 litre V-8 engine, were based upon the Urraco.

Specifications and performance

References

Sources

 Lamborghini Registry

Urraco
Rear mid-engine, rear-wheel-drive vehicles
Cars introduced in 1970
Group 4 (racing) cars
Cars discontinued in 1979